is a Japanese author, competitive karuta player, and teacher. He is the karuta meijin for 2019 to 2021 after taking the title on 5 January 2019 at Omi Jingu. He is a graduate from Kyoto University from the Faculty of Economics and goes on lectures across Japan. He is currently crowdfunding an online English learning tool.

References 

21st-century Japanese businesspeople
Kyoto University alumni
People from Gunma Prefecture
1991 births
Living people